The 2009 Tipperary Senior Hurling Championship was the 119th staging of the Tipperary Senior Hurling Championship since its establishment by the Tipperary County Board in 1887. The championship began on 12 September 2009 and ended on 18 October 2009.

Toomevara were the defending champions, however, they were defeated by Drom-Inch at the semi-final stage.

On 18 October 2009, Thurles Sarsfields won the championship after a 0-14 to 0-05 defeat of Drom-Inch in the final  at Semple Stadium. It was their 30th championship title overall and their first title since 2005.

External links

 The County Senior Hurling Championship - 2009

References

Tipperary Senior Hurling Championship
Tipperary